Hilarempis elegans is a species of dance flies, in the fly family Empididae.

References

Hilarempis
Insects described in 1909
Diptera of South America
Taxa named by Mario Bezzi